Something Wicked This Way Comes is a 1983 American dark fantasy film directed by Jack Clayton and produced by Walt Disney Productions, from a screenplay written by Ray Bradbury, based on his 1962 novel of the same name. It stars Jason Robards, Jonathan Pryce, Diane Ladd, and Pam Grier.

The title was taken from a line in Act IV of William Shakespeare's Macbeth: "By the pricking of my thumbs / Something wicked this way comes".

The film was shot in Vermont and at the Walt Disney Studios in Burbank, California. It had a troubled production – Clayton fell out with Bradbury over an uncredited script rewrite, and after test screenings of the director's cut failed to meet the studio's expectations, Disney sidelined Clayton, fired the original editor, and scrapped the original score, spending some $5 million and many months re-shooting, re-editing and re-scoring the film before its eventual release.

Plot 
In Green Town, Illinois, two young boys, a reserved Will Halloway, and somewhat rebellious Jim Nightshade, leave from an after-school detention for "whispering in class" and hurry off for home. The boys live next door to each other and were born a minute apart on Halloween. Will lives with his grey-haired father Charles and mother while Jim lives with his single mother; it is heavily implied that his father walked out on them. A lightning rod salesman named Tom Fury arrives and sells one to Jim, claiming that it will protect him from an upcoming storm. The boys soon hear of a carnival coming to town led by the ominous Mr. Dark.

The carnival arrives and is set up overnight. Will and Jim notice that many of the residents seem oddly entranced by some of the attractions such as the amputee bartender Ed who sees his missing arm and leg return in a mirror and the boys' teacher Miss Foley who wishes to regain her youth. Will and Jim see a carousel that is closed off and are confronted by Mr. Dark who quickly becomes suspicious of them. Later, they witness Mr. Dark using the carousel on his assistant Mr. Cooger who reverts to a little boy. Will and Jim head off to see Foley, but she is with her "nephew" who is actually Cooger and are forced to leave.

Foley suddenly becomes younger, but loses her vision and is taken by Cooger to Dark. Will gets into an argument with Jim when the latter reveals that he has always been envious of the former being older and wants to use the carousel. They then witness Fury being tortured by Mr. Dark who wants the secret of the upcoming storm and uses his other assistant the Dust Witch to seduce him, but to no avail. The boys run when they are found out and try to go to bed. In the middle of the night, the two are attacked by spiders, but the lightning rod that Fury gave Jim earlier saves them.

In the morning, Mr. Dark leads his carnival, now consisting of some of the townspeople, in a parade though Will and Jim deduce that it is a search party for them. Charles eventually figures out that the boys are in trouble and when confronted by Mr. Dark manages to deter him. Charles, Will and Jim head to the library where the former reveals that the carnival had come to town before and that his own father had fought them. Mr. Dark arrives searching for Will and Jim and offers Charles his youth back, but he resists. He knocks out Charles and makes off with the boys back to the carnival. Charles regains himself and heads to the carnival just as the storm arrives. He runs into Jim's mother and deters her before she too succumbs to Mr. Dark's powers.

Charles heads into the hall of mirrors where Mr. Dark continues to taunt him about his age. Will declares his love for his father and repels the Dust Witch, allowing Fury to escape his imprisonment and impale her with a lightning rod. Will and Charles find Mr. Dark attempting to use the carousel with Jim in tow, but they rescue him just as lightning strikes the ride. As Mr. Dark begins to age and decay, Will and Charles express happiness to awaken Jim and the three flee just as the carnival begins to get sucked away into a giant twister. Will, Jim and Charles head back into town and begin to happily dance back home, with the danger now over.

Cast 

 Jason Robards as Charles Halloway
 Jonathan Pryce as Mr. Dark
 Diane Ladd as Mrs. Nightshade
 Royal Dano as Tom Fury
 Vidal Peterson as Will Halloway
 Arthur Hill as Adult Will (Narrator)
 Shawn Carson as Jim Nightshade
 Mary Grace Canfield as Miss Foley
 Sharan Lea as Young Miss Foley
 Richard Davalos as Mr. Crosetti
 Jack Dodson as Dr. Douglas
 Bruce M. Fischer as Mr. Cooger
 Pam Grier as the Dust Witch
 Jack Dengel as Mr. Tetley
 Ellen Geer as Mrs. Halloway
 James Stacy as Ed, the Bartender
 Tony Christopher as Young Ed
 Angelo Rossitto as Little Person #1

Production 
Ray Bradbury first wrote the original novel as a screenplay adapted from his 1948 short story "Black Ferris" in 1958, intended as a directorial vehicle for Gene Kelly. Financing for the project never came, and Bradbury converted the screenplay into a novel, published in 1962.

In 1971, Bradbury agreed to write a new screenplay based on the novel for Jack Clayton, who Bradbury previously worked with on Moby Dick. In January 1973, Sam Peckinpah was announced as director for the film, with a script written by Bradbury.

By June 1976, Clayton had returned as director and the property was being developed by The Bryna Company, a film production company formed by Kirk Douglas. Douglas became interested in the property after meeting Bradbury at a bookstore in Los Angeles, and initially intended to star in the film. Douglas' son Peter Douglas was the producer of the film alongside Robert Chartoff and Irwin Winkler. They secured a deal with Paramount Pictures to finance the $6,000,000 production, which was to be filmed on location in Texas. However, production never began and the film was eventually put into turnaround by Paramount CEO Barry Diller over the objections of feature division president David V. Picker. At various times, Mark Rydell and Steven Spielberg expressed interest in making the film.

At this time Walt Disney Pictures was concentrating on films with more mature themes in an attempt to break free from their stereotype as an animation and family film studio. In 1981, Disney acquired the film rights to Something Wicked This Way Comes and announced that it would go into production with a $16 million budget. The studio sought Bradbury's input on selecting a cast and director, and he suggested Clayton feeling they had worked well together at Paramount. Peter Douglas returned as the film's producer, but Kirk Douglas was unable to appear in the film despite playing a major role in its pre-production. In a 1981 issue of Cinefantastique, Bradbury stated that his top choices to play Mr. Dark were Peter O'Toole and Christopher Lee, but Disney decided to go with a relatively unknown actor instead in order to keep the budget down, and Jonathan Pryce was eventually cast.

Principal photography on the film began on September 28, 1981, and progressed for 77 days. The production was mostly filmed on Disney's Golden Oak Ranch in Newhall, California, as shooting it on location would have been too costly. Some exterior scenes were shot in Vermont. As the film progressed, two differing visions emerged for the film, with Bradbury and Clayton wishing to stay as faithful to the novel as possible, while Disney wanted to make a more accessible and family friendly film. Bradbury and Clayton fell out during production after Bradbury discovered that Clayton had hired writer John Mortimer to do an uncredited revision of Bradbury's screenplay at the studio's insistence.

At a Q&A session following a 2012 screening of the film, actor Shawn Carson explained that he originally read some 10 times for the part of Will, but after a request from Bradbury, he read for and was cast in the part of Jim Nightshade instead. Although he had blond hair at the time, and co-star Vidal Petersen had dark hair, Carson's hair was dyed jet black and Petersen's was bleached blond to fit the new casting.

For the original score, Clayton picked Georges Delerue who had scored his films The Pumpkin Eater and Our Mother's House, but his score (considered "too dark" by Disney) was later removed and replaced at short notice with a score by James Horner. A soundtrack album of Delerue's unused score was released by Intrada Records in 2015. Horner's replacement score was previously released by the same label in 1998.

Editor Barry Gordon was hired as assistant to the film's original editor, Argyle Nelson Jr. He recalled in 2012 that after Clayton submitted his original cut, Disney expressed concerns about the film's length, pacing and commercial appeal; the studio then took the project out of Clayton's hands and undertook an expensive six-month reshoot and re-edit. Nelson was let go for budgetary reasons, and although Gordon was originally prepared to follow Nelson and leave the production, Nelson encouraged him to stay, and Gordon edited the final cut (resulting in the film's dual editor credits).

Disney spent an additional $5 million on re-filming, re-editing, and re-scoring the picture, and Gordon was required to make a number of changes to Clayton and Nelson's original cut, removing several major special-effects scenes, and incorporating the new material directed by visual effects artist Lee Dyer, including a new spoken prologue narrated by Arthur Hill. Among the casualties was a groundbreaking animation scene, which would have been one of the first major uses of computer-generated imaging in a Hollywood film; combining the then new technology of CGI with traditional animation, it depicted Dark's circus train rolling into town, and the carnival magically materialising – the smoke from the locomotive becomes the ropes and tents, tree limbs grow together to form a ferris wheel, and a spider web morphs into a wheel of fortune. The deleted scene was previewed in detail in the May–June 1983 issue of Twilight Zone Magazine, but in the event, the re-edit retained only a few seconds of the sequence. Another cut sequence depicted Mr. Dark using his sinister powers to send a huge disembodied hand to reach into the house to grab the boys – this mechanical effect was deemed not realistic enough by Disney executives, and was replaced by a new scene in which the room is invaded by hundreds of spiders. This was shot using real spiders, and years later Shawn Carson recalled the considerable discomfort he and Vidal Petersen experienced as a result being exposed to the irritating urticating hairs of the 200 tarantulas used in the sequence.

The original themes of Bradbury's novel, the suggestion of menace, the autumn atmosphere of an American Midwest township and the human relationships between characters that attracted Clayton escaped preview audiences completely, with Clayton heavily criticized. New special effects sequences were shot and a hastily composed new score by composer James Horner replaced Delerue's original music. Initial test screenings did not fare well with audiences, and Disney re-commissioned Bradbury to write an opening narration sequence and new ending.

Bradbury referred to the film's final cut as "not a great film, no, but a decently nice one".

The railroad scenes were filmed on the Sierra Railroad in Tuolumne County, California.

Lost / rejected original version 
The Center for Ray Bradbury Studies in Indianapolis have a copy of the original cut on VHS which may be the only surviving copy of Jack Clayton's original cut.

Reception

Box office 
The film grossed $8.4 million at the domestic box office against its $20 million budget.

Critical response 
Roger Ebert of the Chicago Sun Times gave the film three-and-a-half stars out of four, and wrote: "It's one of the few literary adaptations I've seen in which the film not only captures the mood and tone of the novel, but also the novel's style. Bradbury's prose is a strange hybrid of craftsmanship and lyricism. He builds his stories and novels in a straightforward way, with strong plotting, but his sentences owe more to Thomas Wolfe than to the pulp tradition, and the lyricism isn't missed in this movie. In its descriptions of autumn days, in its heartfelt conversations between a father and a son, in the unabashed romanticism of its evil carnival and even in the perfect rhythm of its title, this is a horror movie with elegance".

Janet Maslin of The New York Times wrote the film "begins on such an overworked Norman Rockwell note that there seems little chance that anything exciting or unexpected will happen. So it's a happy surprise when the film...turns into a lively, entertaining tale combining boyishness and grown-up horror in equal measure"; according to Maslin, "the gee-whiz quality to this adventure is far more excessive in Mr. Bradbury's novel than it is here, as directed by Jack Clayton. Mr. Clayton, who directed a widely admired version of The Turn of the Screw some years ago, gives the film a tension that transcends even its purplest prose".
Kevin Thomas of the Los Angeles Times praised the film as "one of Walt Disney's best efforts in recent years—a film that actually has something to offer adults and adolescents alike".

Variety wrote that the film "must be chalked up as something of a disappointment. Possibilities for a dark, child's view fantasy set in rural America of yore are visible throughout, but various elements have not entirely congealed into a unified achievement...Clayton has done a fine job visualizing the screenplay by Bradbury himself, but has missed really connecting with the heart of the material and bringing it satisfyingly alive".

Gene Siskel of the Chicago Tribune gave the film 2 stars out of 4 and wrote that it "opens promisingly" but has a script which "tries to cram too much material into one story" and a climax that "couldn't be more disappointing", with "neon special effects that overwhelm the last half hour of the movie. The result is an oddball combination of a Twilight Zone episode with the climactic, zapping-the-Nazis scene from Raiders of the Lost Ark".

Richard Harrington of The Washington Post criticized the "lethargic" pace, "stolid acting", and special effects that "are shockingly poor for 1983 (a time-machine carousel is the only effective sequence on that front)".

Tom Milne of The Monthly Film Bulletin lamented that "the novel's texture has been thinned out so ruthlessly that little is left, but the bare bones; and all they add up to, shorn of the slightly self-conscious Faulknerian poetics of Bradbury's style, is a dismayingly schoolmarmish moral tale about fathers and sons, the vanity of illusions, and homespun recipes for dealing with demons ('Happiness makes them run')".

Christopher John reviewed Something Wicked This Way Comes in Ares Magazine #15 and commented that "if the chance ever comes your way to take this one in, grab it. Rarely does such a quiet, yet strong picture get made in this country".

Colin Greenland reviewed Something Wicked This Way Comes for Imagine magazine, and stated that "this is one for the SFX connoisseur, a visual feast".

As of August 2022, the film holds a 59% rating on Rotten Tomatoes, based on 32 reviews. The consensus reads: "True terror and typical Disney wholesomeness clash uncomfortably in Something Wicked This Way Comes".

Accolades 
It won the 1984 Saturn Award for Best Fantasy Film and Saturn Award for Best Writing; it was nominated for five others, including best music for James Horner and best supporting actor for Jonathan Pryce. The film was also nominated for the Hugo Award for Best Dramatic Presentation and Grand Jury Prize at the Avoriaz Fantastic Film Festival.

Remake 
In 2014, Disney announced a remake of Something Wicked This Way Comes with Seth Grahame-Smith writing the script, making his directorial debut, and producing with David Katzenberg from their producing banner KatzSmith Productions. Reportedly, Grahame-Smith wanted to focus mostly on Ray Bradbury's source material from the book.

References

External links 

 
 
 
 
 

1983 fantasy films
1983 films
1983 horror films
American dark fantasy films
American supernatural horror films
American supernatural thriller films
Bryna Productions films
Circus films
Demons in film
Films about witchcraft
Films based on American horror novels
Films based on American novels
Films based on fantasy novels
Films based on works by Ray Bradbury
Films directed by Jack Clayton
Films scored by James Horner
Films set in the 1920s
Films with screenplays by Ray Bradbury
Walt Disney Pictures films
1980s English-language films
Films shot in Los Angeles County, California
Films shot in Vermont
Films set in Illinois
1980s American films